Frances Newbold Noyes Hart (August 1890 – October 25, 1943) was an American writer whose short stories were published in Scribner's magazine, the Saturday Evening Post, the Ladies' Home Journal.

Biography
She was born as Frances Newbold Noyes on August 10, 1890 to Frank Brett Noyes and Janet Thurston Newbold. During World War I, she served as a translator with the Navy and as a canteen worker in France (see her book My AEF: A Hail and Farewell). She married lawyer Edward H. Hart in 1921. She died in 1943.

Publications
 Mark (1913)
My A.E.F.--A Hail and Farewell (1920)
 "Contact" – Pictorial Review, December 1920 (second prize, O Henry Award, 1920). Repr. Contact and Other Stories (1923)
The Bellamy Trial (1927)  – Included on the Haycraft-Queen Cornerstone List
Hide in the Dark (1929)
 Pigs in Clover (1931)
 (with Frank E. Carstarphen) "The Bellamy Trial: A Play in Three Acts" (1931)
The Crooked Lane (1934)

References

External links

1890 births
1943 deaths
Noyes family
American women short story writers
20th-century American short story writers
20th-century American women writers
Writers from Washington, D.C.